Kikilimana (also spelt Kikiliyamana) is a mountain in the Central Province of Sri Lanka.

See also 
 List of mountains of Sri Lanka

References 

Mountains of Sri Lanka
Landforms of Nuwara Eliya District